The Chevrolet Tahoe, and its badge engineered GMC Yukon counterpart, are full-size SUVs from General Motors, offered since 1994 and 1991, respectively. Since 1982, Chevrolet and GMC sold two different-sized SUVs under their 'Blazer' and 'Jimmy' nameplates, by introducing the smaller S-10 Blazer and GMC S-15 Jimmy for the 1983 model year, below the full-size Blazer and Jimmy models. This situation lasted into the early 1990s. GMC first rebadged the full-size Jimmy as the 'Yukon' in 1991. Chevrolet however waited until 1994, when they rebadged the redesigned mid-size S-10 Blazer as their 'new Blazer', while renaming the full-size Blazer as the 'Tahoe'. The name Tahoe refers to the rugged and scenic area surrounding Lake Tahoe in the western United States. The name Yukon refers to the Yukon territory of northern Canada.

For the 1995 model year, the Tahoe and Yukon gained a new, longer 4-door model, slotting in size between the 2-door models and the longer wheelbase Chevrolet/GMC Suburbans.

The Tahoe is sold in North America, parts of Asia such as the Philippines and the Middle East, plus other countries including Bolivia, Chile, Peru, Colombia, Ecuador, and Angola as a left-hand drive vehicle. The Yukon is only sold in North America and the Middle East.

The Chevrolet Tahoe and GMC Yukon are part of General Motors' full-size SUV family and are differentiated from the similar Chevrolet Suburban and GMC Yukon XL primarily by the length of the passenger and cargo area behind the C pillar. An upscale trim Denali sub-model joined the Yukon lineup for the 1999 model year and the Cadillac Escalade is a closely related upscale version sharing the same platform.

As of February 2014, the 2014 Tahoe was the top-ranked Affordable Large SUV in U.S. News & World Reports rankings. The Tahoe has regularly been the best selling full-size SUV in the United States, frequently outselling its competition by 2 to 1.

First generation (1992) 

The new GMC Yukon was introduced in 1991 for the 1992 model year, succeeding the 2nd generation (K5) Jimmy, while Chevrolet continued to use the Blazer name on their 3rd gen K5 model, through the 1994 model year. Removable hard-tops were dropped. All models now had a full-length steel roof, and were 2-door wagons only, through 1994.

However, for 1995, the "Blazer" name was discontinued, and the model was reintroduced as the Chevrolet Tahoe, while also adding all-new, longer 4-door versions, for both brands. Four-door Yukon and Tahoe production started on January 20, 1995, at Janesville Assembly. The Tahoe was Motor Trend magazine's Truck of the Year for 1996.

The Tahoe and Yukon are considerably shorter than the Suburban on which they are based, but share that vehicle's GMT400 platform. It is built on a true truck chassis, derived from the one in the Chevrolet Silverado full-size pickup truck. Both two-door and four-door models were produced in rear- and four-wheel drive versions. Four-door models had a  longer wheelbase, and  greater length than the two-door models. "AutoTrac" full-time all-wheel drive and a programmable Homelink garage door transmitter were added for 1998. The upscale Denali trim line to the Yukon was introduced in 1999.

The standard engine was Chevrolet's  LO5 small-block V8, while a turbocharged  Detroit Diesel V8 was available beginning in 1994.

In Mexico, the two-door Tahoe was released in 1995, called the Chevrolet Silverado, and in 1998, the four-door model was released as the Silverado 4-door. Both models were available with the Base, LS, or luxury LT trim packages. In Venezuela, the two-door Tahoe was released in 1993 (4WD only), called the Chevrolet Grand Blazer, and in 1996, the four-door model was released as the Grand Blazer 4-door (2WD). In 1996 the 2-door was discontinued. In 1996, only the Grand Blazer 4-door 4WD was available. In Bolivia, the four-door model was released in 1995 as the Tahoe 4-door (4WD).

Beginning in 1994, GM began making numerous annual changes to the Blazer/Yukon, including:
 Revised front clip – Blazer (1994)
 Revised interior including a driver-side air bag, revised side mirrors, Blazer renamed Tahoe, four-door option included (1995)
 Revised Vortec 5700 (350 cu in) engine with increased power and fuel efficiency, electronic 4WD shifting, daytime running lights, illuminated entry, and new interior features (1996)
 Revised front clip – Mexican-market Silverado (1996)
 Revised automatic transmission, new EVO (electronic variable orifice) speed-sensitive power steering system and added passenger-side airbag, last year of the two-door Yukon (1997)
 Programmable Homelink garage door transmitter, PassLock security system, heated front seats optional, air conditioning for rear seat passengers, AutoTrac automatic 4WD option added, second-generation airbags, transmissions revised again (1998)
 Last year of the two-door Tahoe (1999)

Tahoe Limited and Tahoe Z71 

When the GMT800-based Chevrolet Tahoe/GMC Yukon was released for the 2000 model year, a 2WD Tahoe Limited and 4WD Tahoe Z71 remained in production on the GMT400 platform as special edition vehicles. These vehicles were produced in the Arlington, Texas, assembly plant for the 2000 model year only.

The Chevrolet Tahoe Limited was based on the Chevrolet Tahoe SS concept vehicle introduced in 1996 that never made it to production. It is reported that GM disliked the idea of an SS-badged vehicle at a time when insurance companies were already demanding higher premiums for SUVs. The Tahoe SS prototype vehicles made in 1996 were painted either an unspecified metallic green or metallic blue, but the Tahoe Limited was produced only in Onyx Black. The Tahoe Limited had a distinctive exterior appearance that included a factory equipped ground effects package, a monochromatic theme with bumpers and grille painted in the same high gloss black as the body, removal of the roof rack, and fog lamps integrated into the front bumper. Other notable features of the Tahoe Limited included the Z60 high-performance chassis package (commonly known as the police package) which places the body of the vehicle  lower than the 4WD Tahoe, two-tone gray and charcoal leather interior seating surfaces, a  gauge cluster,  Bilstein shock absorbers, a 3.42 or optional 3.73 rear gear ratio, a limited slip rear differential, an engine oil cooling system, and distinctive 16 inch Ronal R36 five-spoke aluminum wheels wearing 255/70R16 tires.

The Chevrolet Tahoe Z71 also exhibited a monochromatic appearance similar to the Tahoe Limited, but instead of Onyx Black the Tahoe Z71 was offered in either Light Pewter Metallic, Victory Red, Emerald Green Metallic, or Indigo Blue Metallic. Features of the Tahoe Z71 were similar to those of the Tahoe Limited with a few key differences to distinguish the 2WD Tahoe Limited from the 4WD Tahoe Z71. Features that differ from those previously mentioned on the Tahoe Limited included the Z71 off-road chassis package ( Bilstein shock absorbers, a standard 3.73 rear gear ratio G80 locking differential), color-keyed wheel flares, trim, grille, and bumpers, underbody skid plates, inset driving lights built into the center of the front bumper, oversized two-row radiator, two-tone leather seating surfaces in either a gray or neutral theme, distinctive taillamp lens protectors, black tubular side assist step bars, black brush guard, and distinctive 16-inch Alcoa five-spoke six-lug polished aluminum wheels.

The L31 5.7L Vortec V8 powerplant and 4L60E four-speed automatic transmission shared with other GMT400 Chevrolet Tahoe vehicles were not modified in these special edition vehicles, and as such, these special editions were mostly appearance packages, albeit with unique-handling suspension options.

Second generation (2000) 

Other than the Tahoe Limited Edition, the vehicle was redesigned and launched in January 2000 for the 2000 model year on the new GMT800 platform, still shared with the full-sized pickups and SUVs. Two new engines replaced the old Chevy 5.7 L (350 cu in) small-block V8, and while both were smaller, both produced more horsepower but less torque. In Mexico, the GMT800 Chevy Tahoe is called the Chevrolet Sonora. A 2-door GMT800 Tahoe prototype was made but never entered production. Suburban and Tahoe models sold in Mexico offered the 5.7 L Small-Block Chevrolet V8 (RPO Code R31) as an option in early models, whereas it was replaced by the new 5.3L Vortec V8 engine in all other markets.

Both vehicles received significant updates with only the grille, headlights and body-side moldings distinguishing one from the other. Both vehicles now featured softer lines as part of a more aerodynamic design. The interior was also updated with new seats, dashboard, and door panels.

2000 
All-new Tahoe and Yukon are launched. Side-impact airbags are standard for driver and front passenger, OnStar communications system optional, automatic headlamp control standard, Power-operated sunroof optional for first time, new uplevel 9-speaker audio system with rear mounted subwoofer, Driver Message Center, new PassLock II theft-deterrent system, Autoride Suspension system optional on Tahoe LT and Yukon SLT, all-new independent SLA front suspension with torsion bars and all-new five-link rear suspension with coil springs.

The GMT400 Tahoe was carried over into the 2000 model year as two "Limited Edition" models: the 4X2 Limited, and the 4X4 Z/71. Both models were discontinued after the 2000 model year. The GMC Yukon Denali was redesigned for the 2001 model year, and the Cadillac Escalade was redesigned in 2002 (there was no Escalade for the 2001 model year).

2001 
New colors Forest Green Metallic and Redfire Metallic are introduced while Dark Copper Metallic and Dark Carmine Red Metallic are canceled. Two-tone paint is discontinued, optional Z71 package available on LS 4x4 includes: tube side steps, unique lower molding and wheel flares with extensions, color-keyed grille, bumpers, door handles and mirrors, unique front foglamps, unique luggage carrier with rear roller (roof rack), specifically tuned shock absorbers, 17-inch wheels, P265/70R17 all-terrain tires and OnStar. 40/20/40 bench seat gets revised cupholder design, Tan/Neutral replaces Light Oak/Medium Oak interior trim. Onstar is now optional on Tahoe LS.

2002 
Tahoe LS receives a plethora of new standard features, including: six-way power adjustable seats, heated exterior mirrors with drivers-side auto-dimming feature, electric rear-window defogger and HomeLink Universal Transmitter. Base trim is discontinued. Vortec 5300 V8 is now flex-fuel E85 capable. Tahoe LT models ordered in Redfire Metallic now come with body-color front bumper cap, bodyside moldings and wheel flares. Premium ride suspension is made standard on all models (excluding Z71).

2003 
GM's full-size SUVs saw a major refresh for the 2003 model year. New features include: StabiliTrak stability enhancement system, dual-level airbags, passenger-sensing system, adjustable brake and accelerator pedals with memory. New radio systems with Radio Data System (RDS), custom designed Bose audio system available on models with front bucket seats, XM Satellite Radio, and Panasonic rear-seat DVD entertainment system. Tri-Zone climate control with manual controls standard on LS and Z71, automatic controls standard on LT. Second-row bucket seats optional on models with leather seating surfaces. LT models feature power-adjustable, body-color exterior mirrors with power folding, memory and integrated turn signal indicators.

2003 Tahoe's provided early compliance to the 2005 LATCH (Lower Anchors and Tethers for Children) federal safety standards. A redesigned instrument cluster featured a new Driver Information Center, which can monitor and report on up to 34 different vehicle system functions including: Service StabiliTrak, Ice Possible and Door Ajar. The interior was refreshed, including a new eight-button steering wheel that allows the driver to safely access new infotainment features as well as a redesigned center console.

There were also new improvements to the powertrain and electrical system for 2003. These included a new Electronic Throttle Control (ETC) system to improve throttle feel and new oxygen sensors to improve durability and reduce emissions during engine warm-up. Models sold in California received a more robust catalytic-converter to meet Ultra Low Emissions Vehicle (ULEV) standards. A new battery-rundown protection system automatically turns off the headlamps, parking lamps, and interior lighting if left on for more than 10 minutes with the key removed from the ignition.

New colors for 2003 include Sandalwood Metallic and Dark Spiral Gray Metallic.

2004 
The Tahoe received minor updates for 2004, most notably newly designed 16 and 17-inch wheel choices and a tire pressure monitoring system. Hydroboost brakes and a front passenger seat belt reminder were also added as was a 7-to-4 pin trailer brake wiring adapter. 2004 was the final year Tahoe could be ordered with rear barn doors.

New colors for 2004 were Dark Blue Metallic, Silver Birch Metallic, and Sport Red Metallic.

2005 
New features for 2005 include, Z71 package now available on 2WD models, upgraded tire pressure monitoring system, new OnStar system featuring Gen 6 hardware with analog/digital coverage and upgraded hands-free capabilities. OnStar is now standard on all trims. Touch-screen navigation system now optional. 160-amp alternator, new interior trim, and redesigned aerodynamic side-sill assist steps to improve efficiency. All Tahoes come standard with a rear liftgate and liftglass.

A new all-electric cooling system helps with quiet operation as well as fuel efficiency. New aerodynamic changes, including a new front air deflector, help the Tahoe improve fuel efficiency by one MPG.

New colors include Sandstone Metallic and Bermuda Blue Metallic.

2006  
2006 marked the final year of the Tahoe and Yukon on the GMT800 platform and because of this only minor changes were made. These changes included StabiliTrak standard on all models, combining the OnStar and XM Satellite Radio antennas into one single unit, removal of the Chevrolet badging on the liftgate, removal of rubber trim from the liftglass, relocating the catalytic converter closer to the engine to improve emissions performance and a new manual parking brake adjuster.

Bermuda Blue Metallic now becomes an extra cost option.

The flex-fuel capable Vortec 5300 V8 is now available on all retail packages.

Engines

Third generation (2007) 

General Motors redesigned the Tahoe and Yukon on the new GMT900 platform in late 2005 as a 2007 model. A hybrid version of the Tahoe/Yukon, which uses the shared GM/Chrysler Advanced Hybrid System 2, followed with the 2008 models. The GMT900 based Tahoe and Yukon exceeded initial sales expectations and continued to sell well despite a weakening market for large SUVs. The short-wheelbase Tahoe and its police counterpart began production at Arlington Assembly on December 1, 2005. SWB Yukon production began in early 2006, with Janesville Assembly coming online as well. For the first time, GM used the Tahoe name in Mexico.

For 2007, the GMC Yukon and Chevrolet Tahoe received different front fascias, hood, and tail lights. The GMC Yukon boasted a monolithic grille and headlights, while the Chevrolet Tahoe grille was divided by a body-colored bar similar to the chrome bar found on the GMT800 Tahoe. Both the redesigned Yukon and Tahoe featured a more angular design that gave the vehicles a more upscale appearance than their predecessors. The interior was significantly redesigned as well, features a faux wood trim dashboard with chrome-accented instrument controls. New door panels, as well as new seats, were also added to the interior it still retains its nine-passenger seating availability on LS and SLE models only like the Chevy Suburban and GMC Yukon XL.

A 6-speed 6L80 automatic transmission replaced the 4-speed on all trucks except 2WD models with the 4.8 L engine. The 2011 model has a NHTSA rollover risk of 24.6%, and a lateral roadholding of 0.79g.

In 2008, a two mode hybrid was offered with two trim levels, HY1 or HY2. A  6.0L Vortec 6000 with a pair of  80-hp, 184 ft.-lb. torque electric motors was offered. It had a 0.36 to 0.34 drag coefficient from upgraded body panels and a 12V/300V battery system. The hybrid models also included 300V Electric AC, 42V power steering, and LED taillights (only an option from 2008 to 2013). This variant was named the Green Car of the Year for 2008 by Green Car Journal, a decision which was later lampooned during a segment of the BBC series Top Gear.

During the 2009 model year, LTZ models had the option of the  6.2L Vortec 6200. The option was dropped after only one model year.

2010 models underwent a mild mid-cycle refresh including a slightly raised bumper, removal of the GM "Mark of Excellence" door badge, revised interior door trim, improved side structure, side torso airbags and optional side blind zone alert.

For 2012, the GMC Yukon offered a special Heritage Edition package, featuring unique Heritage Edition exterior badging, embroidered color-keyed carpeted floor mats, embroidered headrests, SLT-2 Equipment Group standard features (such as 10-way memory leather seats and power liftgate), and optional 20-inch wheels. The Heritage Edition added $1,970 to the price of the Yukon and Yukon XL and was offered in three colors, Heritage Blue, White Diamond Tricoat and Onyx Black.

The Apprentice make-your-own-ad contest 
In 2006, the 2007 Tahoe was featured on and promoted through Donald Trump's TV series, The Apprentice, where the two teams put together a show for the top General Motors employees to learn about the new Tahoe. Also, The Apprentice sponsored a controversial online contest in which anyone could create a 30-second commercial for the new Tahoe by entering text captions into the provided video clips; the winner's ad would air on national television. An early example of user-generated marketing, headed by ad agency Campbell Ewald, the campaign began to backfire when hundreds of environmentally conscious parodies flooded YouTube and Chevy's website critiquing the vehicle for its low gas mileage. Over 400 negative ads were created in total; however, over 20,000 positive ads were created which Chevrolet viewed as successful, despite the negative media attention.

Engines

Fourth generation (2015) 

The Chevrolet Tahoe, Chevrolet Suburban, GMC Yukon, GMC Yukon XL, Cadillac Escalade, and Cadillac Escalade ESV had a shortened 2014 model year starting in June 2013, and was replaced with a new version in February 2014 as a 2015 model.

The Tahoe and Yukon are built on the GMT K2XX platform and assigned as K2UC (for Chevrolet Tahoe) and K2UG (for GMC Yukon). Production on the Tahoe and Yukon began in December 2013 with the first completed SUVs being used for testing purposes, and started officially shipping the vehicles to dealerships on February 5, 2014. The 2015 Tahoe was later named the fastest-selling vehicle for February 2014, averaging seven days of sales upon its release. On September 12, 2013, GM released photos and press release of the fourth-generation Tahoe and Yukon. Like its larger siblings Suburban and Yukon XL, the front fascias of the Tahoe and Yukon are distinct, but from the base of the A-pillars back, they share most of the same styling cues. This now includes inlaid doors that tuck into the door sills, instead of over them, improving aerodynamics and fuel economy, and lessens interior noise. The hoods and liftgate panels now are made of aluminum in an effort to reduce vehicle weight. A more-efficient, direct-injected EcoTec3 powertrain coupled with improved aerodynamics help increase fuel economy for the SUVs. Both fourth-generation SUVs do not share a single piece of sheetmetal or lighting element with the brands' full-size pick-up trucks, and the front grilles of both vehicles are slightly altered to give them their own identity. The front headlights features projector-beam headlamps that flanks the Chevrolet-signature dual-port grille – chrome on all models, sweeping into the front fenders, while the LTZ trims feature high-intensity discharge headlamps and light-emitting diode daytime running lamps.

Also new are the addition of fold-flat second- and third-row seats, now a standard feature but can be equipped with an optional power-folding feature for the upgraded trims, and an additional two inches of leg room for second-row passengers. The Tahoe now has an available power-tilt, telescoping steering wheel. For the Yukon variant, this feature is carried over from 2009 to 2014 Yukon Denali, now available in the SLT trim as well. The third-row fold-flat feature is accomplished using a raised platform that reduces available cargo space behind the third-row seats.  Standard third-row seats and raised "fold-flat" platform significantly reduce available cargo space compared with previous Tahoe models. Multiple USB ports and power outlets are now spread throughout their interiors, including one 110-volt, three-prong outlet, with the Tahoe adding an available eight-inch color touch-screen radio with next-generation MyLink connectivity along with an available rear-seat entertainment system (but will not feature a Blu-ray option that is exclusive to the Suburban for 2015), while the Yukon added a standard eight-inch-diagonal color touch screen radio with enhanced IntelliLink and available navigation.

The Yukon interior has more features including seats stuffed with dual-firmness foam, a standard Bose sound system and SD card slots, and laminated glass for the windshield and front windows, decreasing interior noise. GM's third-generation magnetic ride control suspension is optional on the Tahoe LTZ models, whose upgraded features include third-generation magnetic ride control, a real-time damping system that delivers more precise body motion control by "reading" the road every millisecond, and changing damping in just five milliseconds.

The new platform is based on the 2014 Chevrolet Silverado 1500 and GMC Sierra 1500. Both SUVs feature sound deadening material to improve cabin quietness. A new Cadillac Escalade and Cadillac Escalade ESV arrived in dealerships in April 2014. Models continued for the Tahoe and Suburban as LS, LT, and LTZ, and the Yukon and Yukon XL as SLE, SLT, and Denali. The Tahoe and Yukon went on sale in February 2014 as an early 2015 model year vehicle. Prices for the all-new GM SUVs are expected to stay the same as the current-generation GMT900 SUVs. The Tahoe Hybrid, Yukon Hybrid, and Yukon Denali Hybrid models were dropped along with their powertrains, as well as the Cadillac Escalade Hybrid and Cadillac Escalade Hybrid Platinum. The Yukon Denali AWD was also dropped as well.

On September 26, 2014, Chevrolet debuted the updated Z71 Tahoe at the State Fair of Texas, along with the debut of the Texas Edition Tahoe, the latter due to Texas having the largest units of Tahoes sold in the United States (as of August 2014, sales of the Chevrolet SUVs in Texas were up 37 percent) and to celebrate the 60th anniversary of GM's Arlington Assembly plant; production began in October 2014. As with the previous Z71 Tahoe, this version will continue to be offered in a 4WD LT trim only, featuring a front skid plate, off-road tires mounted on 18-inch wheels, a unique grille, running boards and "Z71" identification inside and out. Fog lamps, front tow hooks and front parking assist are also included. The Texas Edition will be available in both LT and LTZ trims, featuring a maximum trailering package, twenty-inch polished aluminum wheels (on LT models), twenty-two-inch premium painted aluminum wheels (on LTZ models), and an exclusive "Texas Edition" badge. The Texas Edition Tahoe package will be part of a lineup that will also use the Texas Edition package, alongside the Suburban and Silverado.

The demand and interest in the redesigned Tahoe has also translated into a 108 percent sales spike since it went on sale in February 2014, with most dealers reporting the units being sold within 17 days after they arrive on the dealership lots, with most customers opting for the fully optioned LTZ model, making it one of Chevrolet's fastest-selling vehicles in 2014 along with Suburban, who posted higher sales and quicker inventory turnovers.

Engines

Safety recalls 
On March 23, 2014, a 2015 GMC Yukon caught fire and went up in flames in Anaheim, California, after a couple, who along with the sales representative who was giving them a test drive, noticed the vehicle stopping and that smoke was starting to make its way into the cabin, prompting the three individuals to park the car and escape before it was destroyed within 15 minutes. The cause of the fire was traced to an oil leak and an engine malfunction. Despite being an isolated incident, the 2015 Tahoe and Yukon are not believed to be tied to GM's announced recall of its vehicles that was made on March 17, 2014. But five days later on March 28, 2014, GM announced a recall on the 2015 Tahoe and Yukon in order to fix a “transmission oil cooler line that is not securely seated in its fitting”, causing the vehicle to stop and rupture the oil cooling line, resulting in the engine to malfunction and catching fire immediately. On June 6, 2014, GM issued another recall on the 2015 Tahoe and Yukon because their radio control modules may not work, and thus prevent certain audible safety warnings.

2015 mid-year update 
The Tahoe received 4G LTE, WiFi, and Siri capability, a new color palette, Brownstone Metallic, and added a hands-free power liftgate feature that is standard on LTZ, but included on LT with the optional Luxury Package. The MyLink with Navigation feature became standard on the LTZ trim, while E85 capability is removed from retail orders

The Yukon, in addition to receiving the aforementioned features, sees the 6.2-liter EcoTec3 V8 engine being updated with the new 8L90E eight-speed automatic transmission for the interim model year, allowing it to improve fuel economy.

A body-colored painted Shark Fin antenna was added with the 2015 mid-year refresh for all models.

2016 
For the 2016 model year, the Chevrolet Tahoe received more upgraded changes and new features, similar to the ones added to the Suburban. The changes included power-adjustable pedals, forward collision alert, IntelliBeam headlamps, lane keep assist and a safety alert seat as part of the newly introduced enhanced driver alert package as an available option on the LS trim. The inside floor console with storage area-SD card reader was removed and a new infotainment system was introduced, officially ending the CD player era for the Tahoe; the 8-inch MyLink feature was expanded to the LS trim and became standard (replacing the 4-inch display), although the navigation feature remains as an option on LT and standard on LTZ. A new liftgate shield was added to the Theft Protection Package, along with the new lane keep assist which replaced the lane departure warning. The capless fuel fill tanks became standard on all trims. Siren Red Tintcoat and Iridescent Pearl Tricoat became the new color trims, replacing Crystal Red Tintcoat and White Diamond Tricoat. The instrument cluster was re-configured with a new multi-color enhancement and a heads-up display was introduced as a standard only on the LTZ trim.

The 2016 GMC Yukon also sees similar changes, with liftgate, power, hands-free now packaged on SLT trims, a free-flow feature that replaced the Premium package, and two new premium colors (Crimson Red Tintcoat and White Frost Tricoat) replacing Crystal Red Tintcoat and White Diamond Tricoat respectively.

The 2016 Tahoe came equipped with both Apple CarPlay and Android Auto Capability features. However, only one of their phone brands at any one time can be used. The 2014 and 2015 LTZ and Denali packages came equipped with a "wireless" charging accessory. while the Android Auto option will only be available on LT and LTZ trims featuring 8 inch screens.

In 2015, the Russian-built Chevrolet Tahoe received the 6.2L V8 L86 EcoTec engine, which was the only engine offered in the region as an exclusive to the Russian and CIS markets only, as GM had no plans to make it available to North America.

2017 
For the 2017 model year, Chevrolet made upgraded changes to the Tahoe. New additions include the teen driver feature, the App Store feature, a rear seat reminder, and low speed forward automatic braking. Two new colors, Blue Velvet and Pepperdust Metallic, were added to replace four colors. The 22-inch wheels option was expanded to three, and the rear seat entertainment system was overhauled. Chevrolet also made changes in the level trims, with the c-pillar badge now removed from LS models and the LTZ trim is renamed to Premier, which will continue to be the top-of-the-line model.

The 2017 model year Yukon also received similar changes, but with a few exceptions. Two new colors, Dark Blue Sapphire Metallic and Mineral Metallic were introduced, the latter exclusive to the Denali, which is also adding a new 22-inch ultra bright aluminum wheels with midnight silver premium paint and a head-up display to its features. The interior backlights changed from red to blue. The heated and vented driver and front passenger seats are now standard on the SLT and Denali trims.

2018 
For the 2018 model year, the 6.2-liter EcoTec3 V8 engine will be available in the Tahoe RST (when bought with the Performance Package). All M.Y. 2018 Tahoe and Suburban trim levels will now be standard with LED Daytime Running Lights which will replace the high beam projector DRLs on LS and LT trim levels. The 2018 Tahoe will have the Custom Edition package added as an option on the base LS trim level. The Chevy Tahoe LS trim level will feature a chrome grille, 18" painted aluminum wheels, 18" all season blackwall tires, and third row seat delete (which reduces passenger capacity to 5 seats from 8 seats) if ordered with the Custom Edition package. The GMC Yukon received a 10 speed automatic transmission on the Denali trim level and the GMC Yukon is facelifted for 2018 with a refreshed grille similar to the one from the 2017 GMC Acadia and 2018 GMC Terrain.

2019 
The 2019 model year Tahoe/Yukon will only see minor changes. One exterior color, Shadow Gray Metallic, will replace both Havana Metallic and Tungsten Metallic, and the Premier model receives a newly redesigned badge on the liftgate.

2020 
The 2020 model year Tahoe/Yukon will have a short tenure due to this being the final year for the fourth generation. Accordingly, Chevrolet is deleting the All Season Package and the LT Signature Package, along with the Pepperdust Metallic exterior color from the Tahoe, while the 2020 GMC Yukon replaced its Pepperdust Metallic color with Carbon Black Metallic with no additional changes.

Fifth generation (2021)

On December 10, 2019, Chevrolet introduced a fifth-generation Tahoe at Little Caesars Arena in Detroit, Michigan. This time around, GM chose to introduce the Chevrolet full size SUVs first, followed by the GMC Yukon in January 2020 and the Cadillac Escalade in February 2020. Following the industry shutdown due to the coronavirus pandemic, the SUVs started production at the Arlington plant on May 18, 2020, and arrived in dealerships in June 2020.

Tahoe
Based on the same GMT T1XX platform as the Silverado 1500, the Tahoe distinguishes itself by swapping that truck's live axle and leaf springs for an independent rear multilink suspension setup with coil springs, thus lowering the floor of the vehicle and creating more room in both the cargo area and the second-and third-row seats.

Carryover trims include the basic LS, LT, and Premier, with Z71 and RST moving from package to trim level, along with the newly-added top-of-the-line High Country trim, giving the Tahoe the highest number of trims of any vehicle in its segment. Quad exhaust tailpipes are available on LT and standard on Premier and High Country.

Although the Tahoe retains a boxy look, it adds a more rounded design and adopts the same Chevrolet design language as the Silverado, featuring a sharply curved front grille and LED lighting. The Tahoe nameplate is given greater prominence, being placed front and center on the higher liftgate.
 
The dashboard and entertainment system have been fleshed out, moving away from the traditional design. Newly updated features include a 10.25-inch touch screen that is now standard on all trims and a pair of 12.6-inch LCD rear screens that can play movies and offer content from passengers’ smartphones and can play different programs on the two screens. A new push-button shifter column (P, R, N, D) is placed on the dashboard, nine camera displays for enhanced towing capabilities, and a total of 30 additional safety features have been implemented throughout the Tahoe. An Air Ride Adaptive Suspension is standard on the higher trims, likewise with an 8-inch driver screen.

Pending any changes due to the COVID-19 pandemic that has slowed down production, the fifth generation Tahoe will go on sale in the second quarter of 2020 as a 2021 model.

Although GM had been making plans to bring the Tahoe to right-hand drive countries for the first time, those plans were temporarily put on hold for the Australasian region due to a low demand for large SUVs and a local company (expected to be Holden Special Vehicles) that was prepared to do the conversions focusing on other productions.

In November 2020, GM announced that their large SUV lineup will be imported to China, marking the Tahoe and Yukon Denali's maiden entry into the country, starting with the 5th generation models. However, General Motors canceled these plans in February 2021, citing the difficulty of having an import being sold alongside its Chinese-built offerings, the makeup of the facilities that would be required to assemble the full-size SUVs, and concerns that the full-size SUVs won't be able to comply with the stringent emission standards imposed by the Government of China.

In November 2021, GM announced that it will began selling the Chevrolet Tahoe in South Korea starting for the 2022 model year. The Tahoe will surpass the Chevrolet Traverse as the largest Chevrolet vehicle in that East Asian country's Chevrolet lineup. The Tahoe will only be available exclusively in one trim level in South Korea, which is the High Country trim level. The Korean-spec Chevrolet Tahoe will be powered by 6.2L L87 V8 petrol engine as the only engine choice for that country. Just like with the Mexican-spec Chevrolet Tahoe, the Korean-spec Tahoe will not be available with the Duramax l-6 diesel engine. All Chevrolet Tahoe SUVs for the Korean market will be manufactured at the Arlington Assembly plant. Sales of the Tahoe in that country began on April 18, 2022.

Yukon
GMC unveiled its fifth-generation Yukon in Vail, Colorado on January 14, 2020, alongside its extended size sibling Yukon XL. Like the Tahoe, the Yukon will also feature an independent rear suspension, a 3.0-liter inline-six turbodiesel engine, and a top-shelf suspension option featuring air springs and magnetic-ride shocks, a standard 5.3-liter V-8, an optional  6.2-liter V-8, and a 10-speed automatic transmission that is standard across the lineup. It also gains 4.9 inches in the wheelbase. The dashboard will have two versions, one similar to the Tahoe while a different one with a larger entertainment screen will be exclusive to the Denali. The Yukon's design follows GMC's design language, with the front grille mimicking the Sierra but the tailgate mimicking the GMC SUV lineup with the lights extended to the tailgate doors.

The lineup of level trims also expanded as well, with the SLE, SLT, and Denali now joined by the 4WD-exclusive AT4, the latter of which comes standard with the Magnetic Ride Control electronically adaptive dampers, AT4-exclusive leather-appointed seats, and stitching with a unique Jet Black interior color and Brandy accents, a heated steering wheel, heated and ventilated front seats, heated second-row outboard seats, a two-speed transfer case, 20-inch Goodyear all-terrain tires, Traction Select System with off-road mode, hill descent control, and skid plates.

The fifth generation Yukon debuted in July 2020 as a 2021 model.

Recalls/safety issue
On August 3, 2020, GM sent out a new TSB (Technical Service Bulletin) that addresses a potential issue related to the engine oil cooler lines on the 2021 Tahoe and Yukon. The issue was sent out to dealerships ahead of receiving the vehicles and were instructed to inspect the engine oil cooler lines at the quick connector on the radiator in order to ensure they are properly seated before selling or dealer-trading the vehicle. No parts were needed for replacement but cautioned customers to have it checked as catastrophic engine failure could occur if not repaired.

GMC Yukon Denali 

The GMC Denali nameplate started as the luxury version of the Yukon for the 1999 model year. The Denali is available on both standard and XL versions and is the top-of-the-line trim in the GMC Yukon lineup.

1999–2000 
In 1998, at the time of its introduction, the Yukon Denali was GM's answer to the Lincoln Navigator, but then GM introduced a clone to the Yukon Denali and rebadged it "Escalade" under the Cadillac nameplate. The Yukon Denali's exterior was shared with the Cadillac Escalade, with the entire front clip and lower side body panels differing from the standard Yukon. In the interior, in addition, the Denali features luxury options not available in the Yukon. These included an upgraded leather interior, power seats, heated seats front and rear, Bose stereo system, and some woodgrain on the dashboard. The 1999 Yukon Denali and Escalade also saw the first application of GM's OnStar communications system in a full-size SUV.

2001–2006 

Even though the Yukon was redesigned alongside the Chevrolet Suburban and Tahoe in 2000, the Denali and Escalade remained on the GMT400 platform. It was not until 2001 that the Denali and Escalade were redesigned. While the Escalade departed from its Yukon based exterior design scheme in attempt to hide its roots, the Yukon Denali's exterior is almost the same as that of a post-2000 model year GMT800 Yukon. Embossed side body panels and slightly reworked headlights with projector-beam lenses along with 17" polished wheels and a unique grille and front bumper differentiate the Yukon Denali from the regular Yukon. 2001 also saw the introduction of the "punch" grille which now has become the hallmark of the Denali nameplate.

2007–2014 

The Yukon Denali was redesigned for the 2007 model year alongside the regular mainstream Yukon. The biggest change was in the styling, such as the flattened tailgate reminiscent of the new Tahoe, and particularly the grill and headlight shapes, which made the Yukon look less aggressive than previous models. The only exterior difference between the Yukon Denali and the standard Yukon are the chrome grille and extensive use of chrome accents; and of course the insignias, embeveled rockerpanels, chromed headlights and the Vortec 6200 engine which it shares with the Cadillac Escalade. For the 2009 model year, the Yukon comes with a standard power-tilting steering wheel, exclusive to the Denali trim.

2015–2020

The Yukon Denali was redesigned and updated along with other GM SUVs in September 2013 and went to dealerships on February 5, 2014 as a 2015 model. The Yukon Denali continues with the top-of-the-line features (using the similar features found in the Tahoe LTZ trim) and the front grille honeycomb design, equipped with a new active noise-cancellation technology and GM's third-generation magnetic ride control suspension as a standard feature. In November 2014 The Yukon Denali saw its MSRP bumped up by $1,300 in part due to the loaded features added to its 2015 mid-year updates.

2021-present

The fifth generation Yukon Denali was introduced in January 2020. The updated and redesigned vehicle will move up in its top-of-the-line level trim due to the introduction of the AT4 that was slotted above the SLT level. It will also have a different dashboard feature that will be exclusive to this trim.

Hybrid vehicle 

The Tahoe made its hybrid electric debut in late 2007. In January 2008, starting price was US$50,540. The starting price of the 2009 model was increased to US$51,405.

The Chevrolet Tahoe Hybrid uses a combination of its dual displacement 3.0/6.0 L V8 engine and two  (continuous) electric motors with a 300-volt, 1.53 kWh nickel-metal hydride battery. The vehicle can run on either gasoline, electricity or a mixture of the two using automatic Two-Mode Hybrid system that monitors the vehicle's torque, and state of the battery to choose the most efficient source of power. The battery is charged either directly by generating electricity through driving one or both electric motors using the gasoline engine (while the vehicle is coasting or being driven by the gasoline engine), or by the wheels driving one or both electric motors through what is called "Regenerative braking" when the vehicle is decelerating, thus regaining some of the energy invested in forward momentum. The Tahoe is considered a strong or full hybrid, in that it can run entirely on the battery (for a limited range) at low speeds.

The Tahoe and Yukon Hybrid models were discontinued after the 2013 model year as GM moved to make their SUVs more fuel efficient with the introduction of the EcoTec engine that they would later install in the 2015 Tahoe and Yukon.

Outside the United States 
In Brazil the Tahoe GMT400 was sold under the name of "Grand Blazer", sourced from Argentina with rear-wheel drive only, regionally-sourced 6-cylinder engines (the late-type 4.1 M.P.F.I. Chevrolet straight-6 as the only gasoline-powered option and the 4.2L MWM Sprint 6.07T for those who preferred Diesel) and manual transmission. The GMT400 is used by Brazilian elite police units, such as the BOPE (Batalhão de Operações Policiais Especiais) in Rio de Janeiro and the ROTA (Rondas Ostensivas Tobias de Aguiar) and GATE (Grupo de Ações Taticas Especiais) in São Paulo. It is also used by the São Paulo State Police and the Rio Grande do Sul State Police. But as the cars grew old, the great majority of them were substituted, mainly by the smaller Chevrolet Blazer midsize SUV. The Tahoe name was not used in Brazil because it would be unfamiliar to most Brazilians since it refers to the Lake Tahoe on the border of Nevada and California.

Elsewhere in South America, Chile, has incorporated the Tahoe as a transport vehicle for the special operations unit (GOPE) of the Chilean Police (Carabineros de Chile) to carry communication equipment.

The Tahoe was also assembled in Venezuela from CKD kits for three generations, being phased out in 2014 along most of the local Chevrolet range due to unfavorable economic conditions and political circumstances. The fourth generation of the Tahoe has not been available in Venezuela.

In Ecuador, due to the tax benefits hybrid vehicles offer, the third generation of the Tahoe was offered only in the hybrid version until 2011. A review of the benefit to exclude hybrid vehicles with a displacement greater than 1.8L rendered the Tahoe Hybrid less cost-effective than the non-hybrid in Ecuador.

Police package 

In North America, the Tahoe is used by many law enforcement agencies, fire departments, and EMS agencies. Prior to the announcement of the Z56 police package model the civilian base & LS models based on the GMT400 were used in police service. During the 1997 model year, the Tahoe was offered with the Z56 police option using suspension components from the discontinued 454SS truck – the first Tahoe Z56s were available only in 2WD until the GMT400 was phased out. The original prototype had rear disc brakes based on the B-body 9C1s whereas the production Z56s came with rear drum brakes. Plans for outfitting the Tahoe with the Z56 police package originated around the 1994 model year when GM broke news about phasing out its B-platform sedans (Caprice, Impala SS, Roadmaster) at the end of the 1996 model year where a replacement was imminent since GM ended production of its body-on-frame passenger sedans due to SUV sales. Since the introduction of the GMT900, Chevrolet currently offers two versions of the police package Tahoe; a four-wheel-drive version and a two-wheel-drive version. Just like the GMT400 based models civilian GMT800 Tahoe base & LS models were also used for police use until the Z56 police package option was reintroduced in 2004 late in the GMT800's life cycle by some agencies.

Chevrolet refers to the four-wheel drive (4WD) version as "Special Service Vehicle" (SSV) which has the 5W4 code. This version of the Tahoe can be used for all purposes except pursuits and high speed responses due to its high center of gravity just below the front window (height, not location), thus having a higher probability of rolling-over at high speeds. This version is preferred by agencies where snow, ice, flooding, rough terrain, and ground clearance are common issues.[34]

Chevrolet refers to the two-wheel drive (2WD) version—also known as the rear-wheel drive (RWD) version—as "Police Pursuit Vehicle" (PPV). This version be used for all purposes including pursuits and high speed responses. The center of gravity in this vehicle is lower than that of the four-wheel-drive version and the ground clearance is about 1 in (25 mm) less, with a standard rear bumper replacing the tow hitch on civilian Tahoes. Highway patrol agencies prefer the two-wheel-drive version, where pursuits and long distance responses are more common. As of the 2012 model year, the Tahoe was the last body-on-frame, rear-wheel drive police vehicle manufactured for the United States market since Ford phased out its aging Panther platform, the Volvo XC90-based Ford Police Interceptor (known as the Ford Explorer in civilian trim). Other SUVs like the Ford Expedition are used by many law enforcement and EMS agencies, but are not pursuit rated.[35]

Chevrolet built a 2015 Chevrolet Tahoe Police Patrol Vehicle that was previewed as a concept at the 2013 SEMA Show in Las Vegas. The vehicle became available in 2WD and 4WD drivetrains with orders coming in the first quarter of 2014 for special service models, followed by the orders for the police pursuit models afterwards.

2021 PPV
The 2021 Tahoe PPV marks the most drastic change from the standard Tahoe.  Rocker covers are borrowed from the GM LT4 engine found in high performance Corvettes, Camaros and Cadillacs. Engine and transmission coolers are PPV specific.  Bridgestone co-developed Firehawk Pursuit tires with GM for the 20 inch steel wheels.  6 piston,16 inch rotor Brembo brakes are standard issue on the PPV. The suspension is lowered and further fortified.  All wheel drive is standard and sent to the front as needed with a limited slip clutch in the transfer case.  160 MPH speedometer is standard and alternator almost doubles the amperage of the standard Tahoe. This version of the PPV uses the 9C1 code instead of the Z56 code.

Military applications

When production of the CUCV II ended in 2000, GM redesigned it to coincide with civilian truck offerings. The CUCV nomenclature was changed to Light Service Support Vehicle in 2001.  In 2005, LSSV production switched to AM General, a unit of MacAndrews and Forbes Holdings. The LSSV is a GM-built Chevrolet Silverado 1500, Chevrolet Silverado 2500 HD, Chevrolet Tahoe, or Chevrolet Suburban that is powered by 5.3 for the Tahoe, 6.0 for the Suburban, and a Duramax 6.6 liter turbo diesel engine for The pickup trucks. As GM has periodically redesigned its civilian trucks and SUVs from 2001 to the present, LSSVs have also been updated cosmetically.

The militarization of standard GM trucks/SUVs to become LSSVs includes exterior changes such as CARC paint (Forest Green, Desert Sand, or 3-color Camouflage), blackout lights, military bumpers, a brush guard, a NATO slave receptacle/NATO trailer receptacle, a pintle hook, tow shackles and a 24/12 volt electrical system. The dashboard has additional controls and dataplates. The truck also can be equipped with weapon supports in the cab, cargo tie down hooks, folding troop seats, pioneer tools, winches, and other military accessories. In the Canadian Army these vehicles are nicknamed "Milverado".

The Enhanced Mobility Package (EMP) option adds an uprated suspension, 4-wheel anti-lock brakes, a locking rear differential, beadlock tires, a tire pressure monitoring system and other upgrades. About 2,000 LSSV units have been sold to U.S. and international military and law enforcement organizations.

Variants 
Cargo/Troop Carrier Pickup (2-door, Extended Cab, or 4-door Silverado)
Cargo/Troop Carrier/Command Vehicle (4-door Tahoe)
Cargo/Troop Carrier/Command Vehicle/Ambulance (4-door Suburban)

Yearly American sales 
Effective 2018, sales of the GMC Yukon XL are reported together with the GMC Yukon.  Sales figures for the Yukon XL prior to 2018 are listed with the Chevrolet Suburban.

References 

Chevrolet TAHOE RST 2018

External links 

 
 GMC Yukon (twin model)

Tahoe
Tahoe
Cars introduced in 1995
Vehicles introduced in 1995
2000s cars
2010s cars
2020s cars
All-wheel-drive vehicles
Flexible-fuel vehicles
Full-size sport utility vehicles
Hybrid electric vehicles
Hybrid sport utility vehicles
Luxury sport utility vehicles
Military light utility vehicles
Pickup trucks
Police vehicles
Rear-wheel-drive vehicles
Motor vehicles manufactured in the United States